Pierson Vocational High School is a high school in Nogales, Arizona under the jurisdiction of the Nogales Unified School District.

References

Public high schools in Arizona
Schools in Santa Cruz County, Arizona